The Elk Lakes cabin is an alpine hut located between the French and Italian Military Groups in the Canadian Rockies. It resides near the Continental Divide in Elk Lakes Provincial Park, British Columbia. It is 62 km south of the Trans-Canada Highway in Kananaskis Country, Alberta and 104 km north of Sparwood, British Columbia. The area has hiking trails, and provides access to mountaineering objectives. In winter, ice climbs and skiing terrain with much powder abound. Elk Lakes terrain is similar to that near the Elizabeth Parker hut. The hut is maintained by the Alpine Club of Canada.

The cabin offers easy access and a wide range of hiking, skiing and climbing opportunities. In 2019, BC Parks created a competitive bidding process for operating the cabin.

History 
The cabin was built in 1992 to house BC Parks rangers. In 2003, BC Parks issued a request for proposals to convert the cabin to public use. The Alpine Club of Canada (ACC) was selected to expand its extensive alpine hut system, and began operating it in the summer of 2004.

Facilities

The kitchen area and living room offer tables and a wood-burning stove. The sleeping quarters are in a loft. Sleepers occupy two long bunks and one shorter one.

The hut offers water buckets, axes, saws and shovels.

A tributary of Elkan Creek runs nearby. In winter, water is there and from snowmelt. Water must be purified before drinking.

Sinks are connected to the sump. It occasionally freezes, in which case grey water (strained of food particles) should be dumped within a three-metre radius of the outhouse.

The outhouse is located 10 m east of the cabin. All paper garbage and food scraps should be burned, and all other garbage and unused food carried out.

Necessary supplies
 Sleeping bag
 Toilet paper
 Newspaper for lighting the fire
 Matches
 First aid kit
 9 volt battery for the smoke detector

Activities
Located within the western ranges of the southern Rocky Mountains, Elk Lakes Provincial Park is an easily accessible wilderness park characterized by subalpine landscapes, remnant glaciers, peaks and lakes.

The area has many hiking options. Options for hikers of all abilities and interests are available, including family friendly backcountry hiking. Other trails are longer, more exposed and involve some route-finding.

Several mountaineering objectives and scrambles are available. Mounts Fox, Aosta, Petain, Nivelle and Castelnau can all be summited in a moderate to long day from the cabin. Mount Joffre is accessible from the Elk Lakes side, although a high camp is recommended for climbers.

The cabin supports backcountry skiing in winter. It is one of the few Canadian Alpine huts that can be reached on cross country skis by advanced skiers. Ski touring ranges from flat tours to advanced ski mountaineering.

The area has several waterfall ice routes and a established mixed climb.

Nearby
 Elk Lakes
 Elk River
 Mount Aosta
 Mount Castelnau
 Mount Fox
 Mount Joffre
 Mount Nivelle
 Mount Pétain
 Petain Falls

Parks Information
Elk Lakes Provincial Park is a BC park. Access from the Alberta side is through Peter Lougheed Provincial Park. Parks have rules about dogs, fishing, bicycles and other things. Dogs are not allowed on ski trails, nor inside the cabin. Bikes are allowed on the trail to Elk Pass (in Peter Lougheed Park) and along the power line to the cabin, but not elsewhere in Elk Lakes Park.

Campgrounds are available in both parks, including one a kilometre from the cabin.

References

Further reading

External links
 Elk Lakes cabin at the Alpine Club of Canada
 Elk Lakes cabin at bivouac.com
  Shows access to cabin, but not the cabin itself
 Cabin is 1 km west of lower Elk Lake
 Weather forecasts from Environment Canada Click on BC, then scroll down to Sparwood. The weather forecasts are updated 3 times daily.
 Public avalanche bulletins from Avalanche Canada. The avalanche forecast is updated daily throughout the winter season.
 Google Earth

Mountain huts in Canada
Elk Valley (British Columbia)
1992 establishments in British Columbia
Buildings and structures completed in 1992
Buildings and structures in British Columbia